Edmund Beckett may refer to:

Edmund Beckett, 1st Baron Grimthorpe (1816–1905), lawyer
Sir Edmund Beckett, 4th Baronet (1787–1874), Conservative MP

See also
Edmund Beckett Denison (disambiguation)